The white-ankled mouse (Peromyscus pectoralis) is a species of rodent in the family Cricetidae. It is found in Mexico and in New Mexico, Oklahoma and Texas in the United States.

The white-ankled mouse is commonly found in coexistence with the brush mouse and Texas mouse (P. boylii and P. attaweri, respectively). Often, the sympatric overlap in characteristics between these species makes it difficult to identify a specific species.  The most distinguishing feature of the white-ankled mouse, and the one most used to identify the species, is the baculum of males (Hooper 1958). The tip of the white-ankled mouse's baculum is long and cartilaginous, whereas the tips of brush and Texas mice are short and rounded (Clark 1952 and Hooper 1958).

Description
White-ankled mice have three distinct pelages in their life cycles: juvenile, subadult, and adult. Two molt phases (post-juvenile and post-subadult) are necessary for the distinct pelages in each phase of their lives (Hoffmeister 1951).

In Texas, the white-ankled mouse differs from the Texas mouse by having shorter hind feet, white ankles, paler color, and a more defined bicolor tail. The white-ankled mouse differs from the Brush mouse by having smaller molar teeth, white ankles, and shorter hair on the end of the tail (Clark 1953 and Hooper 1958).

Distribution and habitat
Because of the physical similarities between the white-ankled mouse and other mice species, the white-ankled mouse is often misidentified. In New Mexico, for example, many of the distribution ranges of the white-ankled mouse were based on misidentified museum specimens. Upon both further review of these specimens and an experiment involving live traps, the actual distribution of the white-ankled mouse in New Mexico was expanded by 225 km north-northwest (Geluso 2004).

When studying the microhabitats of these coexisting mice, it was discovered that the Texas mouse utilizes trees and the white-ankled mouse does not (Etheredge 1989). In an experiment that removed the Texas mice from these cohabitated microhabitats, the white-ankled mice still did not use the trees. These findings suggest the microhabitats on the white-ankled mouse are inherently selected rather than a result of interspecific competition (Mullican 1990).

The white-ankled mouse is partial to rocky and bushy terrains within a variety of habitats: deserts, grasslands and woodlands(Kilpatrick 1971 ).

Diet
White-ankled mice have been known to feed on a variety of seeds, including hackberries, acorns, juniper berries, and cactus fruit (Davis 1966 and Alvarex 1963).

References

 Musser, G. G. and M. D. Carleton. 2005. Superfamily Muroidea. pp. 894–1531 in Mammal Species of the World a Taxonomic and Geographic Reference. D. E. Wilson and D. M. Reeder eds. Johns Hopkins University Press, Baltimore.
 Alavrez, T. 1963. Mammals of Tamaulipas, Mexico. Univ. Kansas Publ., Mus. Nat. Hist. 14:363-473.
 Clark, W. K. 1952. Isolating mechanisms, competition, and geographic variation of the Peromyscus boylei group in Oklahoma and Texas. Unpublished Ph.D. dissertation, Univ. Texas, 102 pp. 
 Davis, W.B. 1966. The mammals of Texas. Bull. Texas Game and Fish Comm. 41:5-267
 Etheredge, D.R., M.D. Engstrom, and R. C. Stone. 1989. Habitat discrimination between sympatric populations of Peromyscus attwateri and Peromyscus pectoralis in west-central Texas. Journal of Mammalogy, 70:300-307.
 Geluso, Keith. "Distribution of the white-ankled mouse (Peromyscus pectoralis) in New Mexico." The Southwestern Naturalist 49.2 (2004): 283–288.
 Hoffmeister, D. F. 1951. A taxonomic and evolutionary study of the pinon mouse Peromyscus truei. Illinois Biol. Monogr. 21:1-104.
 Hooper, E.T. 1958. The male phallus in mice of the genus Peromyscus. Misc. Publ. Mus. Zool., Univ. Michigan 105:1-24
 Kilpatrick, C. W. 1971, Distribution of the brush mouse. Permomyscus boylii, and the encinal mouse, Permoyscus pectoralis, in north-central Texas. Southwestern Nat. 16: 209-220
 Mullican, Tim R., and John T. Baccus. "Horizontal and vertical movements of the white-ankled mouse (Peromyscus pectoralis) in central Texas." Journal of mammalogy (1990): 378–381.

Peromyscus
Rodents of North America
Mammals of Mexico
Mammals of the United States
Mammals described in 1904
Taxonomy articles created by Polbot